Kathryn Joan "Kate" Schmidt (born December 29, 1953) is an American former world record holder in the javelin throw. A native of California, graduate of Woodrow Wilson Classical High School, and alumnus of UCLA, she won bronze medals at the 1972 and 1976 Olympics. She qualified for the 1980 Olympics, but did not compete due to the 1980 Summer Olympics boycott.  She placed fourth at the 1984 Olympic Trials.

From 1972 to 1977, Schmidt won seven national titles. Her throw was almost 30 feet longer than the previous American record of  set by Barbara Friedrich in 1967. Schmidt holds twelve of the top 20 spots of the farthest throws ever by an American. She held the American record until the women's javelin was redesigned in 1999, resetting the records.

Schmidt is a member of the USATF National Track and Field Hall of Fame (1994), the National Throws Coaches Hall of Fame, the CSULB Hall of Fame, the LBCC HAll of Fame, and the Woodrow Wilson High School Hall of Fame (Long Beach, CA).

Schmidt owns HomeBodies, a mobile fitness and rehab business, and was the men's and women's throwing coach for Occidental College in Northern Los Angeles for a while.  Schmidt is also an abstract artist with works on display with the Art of the Olympians (AOTO) organization.

1996, Kate Schmidt (age 42) won the javelin at the Masters National Outdoor Track and Field Championship, Spokane, WA.

References

External links

1953 births
Living people
People from Long Beach, California
Track and field athletes from California
American female javelin throwers
World record setters in athletics (track and field)
Olympic bronze medalists for the United States in track and field
Athletes (track and field) at the 1972 Summer Olympics
Athletes (track and field) at the 1976 Summer Olympics
UCLA Bruins women's track and field athletes
Medalists at the 1976 Summer Olympics
Medalists at the 1972 Summer Olympics
Universiade medalists in athletics (track and field)
Universiade silver medalists for the United States
Medalists at the 1973 Summer Universiade
Medalists at the 1975 Summer Universiade
American masters athletes